This is a list of notable people who have died by choking.

 405 BC: Sophocles (91), Diodorus Siculus claims Sophocles choked on a grape-seed in a cup of wine.
 circa 200: Lucius Fabius Cilo, Pliny the Elder claims "Chilo" perished from choking on a single hair in a draught of milk.
 453: Attila the Hun (47), although cause of death is disputed.
 1065: Godwin, Earl of Wessex (~55), reported (by Aelred of Rievaulx) to have choked to death at a Winchester banquet with Edward the Confessor after asking God to witness his claimed innocence in the death of Edward's brother.
 1946: Alexander Alekhine (53), autopsy indicates heart attack, but supposed witness claimed choking.
 1956: Tommy Dorsey (51)
 1957: Raymond Griffith (62)
 1960: Air Marshal Subroto Mukerjee (49), first Chief of the Air Staff of the Indian Air Force (IAF), died on 8 November 1960 at Tokyo by choking on a piece of food lodged in his windpipe.
 1963: Skinnay Ennis (55)
 1967: Jimmie Foxx, famous Major League Baseball player, died by choking on a bone on 21 July 1967 aged 59.
 1970: Jimi Hendrix (27), choked on his aspirated vomit while unconscious with barbiturates.
 1971: T. V. Soong (76), former premier of Republic of China
 1978: Dingle Foot (72), well known British politician and brother to future Labour Party Leader Michael Foot died in a Hong Kong hotel after choking on bone in a chicken sandwich.
 1980: John Bonham (32), Led Zeppelin drummer.  Bonham had consumed around 40 shots (1–1.4 litres) of 40% ABV vodka in a 24 hour period, after which he vomited and choked (a condition known as pulmonary aspiration). The finding was accidental death.
 1981: Christy Brown (49)
 2009: Christopher Nolan (43), Irish poet and author.
 2015: Praful Bidwai (66), Indian journalist and activist, died by choking on food on 23 June 2015 at a conference in Amsterdam.
 2017: American rapper Prodigy (42) of Mobb Deep, died by accidental choking.

References

Choking